Long Wenhao (born 30 March 1997) is a Chinese footballer who plays for Guangzhou R&F.

Club career
Long Wenhao started his professional football career in August 2016 when he was loaned to Hong Kong Premier League side R&F, which was the satellite team of Guangzhou R&F. He made his senior debut on 18 September 2016 in the 2016–17 Hong Kong Senior Challenge Shield against BC Glory Sky. His league debut came on 30 September 2016 in a 2–1 away win against Hong Kong Pegasus. He shared the starting position with Xing Yu, playing 11 matches for R&F in the 2016–17 season. Long was promoted to Guangzhou R&F's first team squad in June 2017.

Career statistics
.

References

External links
 

1997 births
Living people
Chinese footballers
Footballers from Guangzhou
Guangzhou City F.C. players
R&F (Hong Kong) players
Association football goalkeepers
Hong Kong Premier League players
Chinese Super League players